The 1962–63 Bowling Green Falcons men's basketball team was an NCAA University Division college basketball team competing in the Mid-American Conference. They finished with 19 wins and 8 losses, and in conference play, they led the MAC with 9 wins and 3 losses. In the 1963 NCAA tournament, they beat Notre Dame in the Mideast regional quarterfinal before falling to Illinois in the regional semifinal.

Roster

References

Bowling Green Falcons men's basketball seasons
Bowling Green
Bowling Green
Bowling Green